Chelmsford Wonder is a cooking apple cultivar.

Raised at Chelmsford about 1870 and introduced by local nurseryman William Saltmarsh in 1892. A large long keeping yellow-skinned apple with diffuse orange pink flush. Still grown in Essex orchards.

It is also grown at Brogdale National Fruit Collection in Kent.

References 

Apple cultivars
Chelmsford Wonder apple
Cooking apples
British apples